Hecatompedum or Hekatompedon was an ancient Greek city in the interior of Chaonia located in the region of Epirus. Its site is tentatively located near modern Saraqinisht.

See also
List of cities in ancient Epirus

References

Citations

Sources

Cities in ancient Epirus
Populated places in ancient Epirus
Former populated places in the Balkans